This article is a list of mesivtas. A mesivta is a Jewish orthodox yeshiva secondary school for boys. The term is commonly used in the United States to describe a yeshiva that emphasizes Talmudic studies for boys in grades 9 through 11 or 12; alternately, it refers to the religious studies track in a yeshiva high school that offers both religious and secular studies.

Australia 
Mesivta Melbourne

Canada 
Mesivta Ateres Menachem of Montreal
Mesivta Birchas Shmuel of Toronto
Mesivta Chabad of Toronto
Mesivta Ohr Tmimim of Toronto
Yeshiva Darchei Torah of Toronto
Yeshivas Nachlas Tzvi of Toronto
Yeshivas Ner Yisroel of Toronto
Yeshiva Gedola Zichron Shmayahu of Toronto
Yeshivas Mishkan HaTorah of Toronto
Yeshivas Mishkan Yosef of Toronto

Israel 
Mesivta Beit Shemesh
List of Israeli Yeshiva high-schools (Hebrew category)
List of Israeli Yeshivot ketanot (Hebrew category)

United Kingdom 
Manchester Mesivta School

United States

Alabama

Alaska

Arizona 
 Yeshiva High School of Arizona. Phoenix
 Yeshivas HaTurim. Rabbi Shimon Green's Yeshiva Phoenix

Arkansas

California
Mesivta of Los Angeles, Los Angeles
Mesivta of Greater Los Angeles, Calabasas
Mesivta Birkas Yitzchok, Los Angeles
Yeshiva Gedolah of Los Angeles, Los Angeles
Southern California Yeshiva High School, San Diego
Valley Torah High School, Valley Village
Yeshiva Ohr Elchonon Chabad High School, Los Angeles

Colorado 
Denver Academy of Torah, Denver
Yeshiva Toras Chaim, Denver

Connecticut
Mesivta Ateres Shmuel, Waterbury
Yeshiva Beis Dovid Shlomo, New Haven

Delaware

District of Columbia

Florida
Klurman Mesivta High School, Miami Beach
Mesivta of Greater Miami
Mesivta of Coral Springs
Rabbi Alexander S. Gross Hebrew Academy
South Florida Jewish Academy, Coconut Creek
Weinbaum Yeshiva High School, Boca Raton
Yeshiva Doresh, Miami
Yeshiva Toras Chaim Toras Emes, North Miami Beach

Georgia 
Yeshiva Ohr Yisrael. Atlanta

Hawaii

Idaho

Illinois
Fasman Yeshiva High School
Hebrew Theological College
Telshe Yeshiva of Chicago
Yeshivas Ohr Eliyahu Lubavitch Mesivta of Chicago

Indiana 
Yeshiva Gedola of South Bend

Iowa 
Lubavitch Mesivta of Postville

Kansas

Kentucky

Louisiana

Maine

Maryland 
Bais Hamedrash and Mesivta of Baltimore
Mesivta Kesser Torah of Baltimore
Mesivta Neimus Hatorah
Yeshiva of Greater Washington, Silver Spring
Yeshivas Toras Chaim of Baltimore

Massachusetts
Mesivta High School of Greater Boston, Brighton
Yeshiva Ohr Yisrael, Chestnut Hill

Michigan 
Mesivta of West Bloomfield
Lubavitch Mesivta and Yeshiva Oak Park

Minnesota 
Yeshiva of Minneapolis

Mississippi

Missouri
Mesivta d'Missouri (St. Louis)
Missouri Torah Institute, Chesterfield

Montana

Nebraska

Nevada 
Mesivta of Las Vegas, Henderson

New Hampshire

New Jersey
Mesivta Zichron Baruch, Clifton
Mesivta Nachlas Dovid (Rabbi Lurria)
Mesivta Pe'er Hatorah, Lakewood
Mesivta Ohr Torah of Lakewood
Mesivta of Eatontown
 Mesivta Me'or Hatorah, Lakewood

New Mexico

New York
Kaminetzer Mesivta of Boro Park
Mesivta Ateres Yaakov, Long Island
Mesivta Beis Yisroel (Ger)
Mesivta Beth Shraga, Monsey
Mesivta Chofetz Chaim, Flushing
Mesivta Eitz Chaim of Bobov, Brooklyn
Mesivta Kesser Yisroel of Willowbrook, Staten Island
Mesivta Menachem of Buffalo
Mesivta Meor Hatorah, Brooklyn
Mesivta Nachlas Yakov, Brooklyn (Vien)
Mesivta of Eastern Parkway
Mesivta of Long Beach
Mesivta Ohel Shmuel, Bedford Hills
Mesivta Rabbi Chaim Berlin, Brooklyn 
Mesivta Rabbi Samson Raphael Hirsch, New York 
Mesivta Bais Ahron Tzvi Veretzky, Brooklyn, NY
Mesivta Tiferes Yisroel, Brooklyn
Mesivta Tifereth Yerushalayim, New York and Staten Island
Mesivta Torah Vodaath, Brooklyn
Mesivta Yam HaTorah, Bayswater
Mesivta Yesodei Yeshurun, Kew Gardens Hills
Oholei Torah Mesivta, Brooklyn
Rambam Mesivta, Long Island
Uta Mesivta of Kiryas Joel
Mesivta Meor Hatorah Lakewood, New Jersey

North Carolina 
American Hebrew Academy, Greensboro

North Dakota

Ohio 
Hebrew Academy of Cleveland
Telshe Yeshiva, Wycliffe
Yeshivas Ahavas HaTorah, Cleveland
Yeshivas Lubavitch, Cincinnati
Mesivta of Cincinnati

Oklahoma

Oregon

Pennsylvania
Kohelet Yeshiva High School, Merion Station
Mesivta Of Allegheny County, White Oak
Mesivta High School of Greater Philadelphia, Bala Cynwyd
Mesivta Yesodai Yisael, Elkins Park
Milton Eisner Yeshiva High School, Scranton
Talmudical Yeshiva of Philadelphia

Rhode Island 
New England Rabbinical College, (Providence, Rhode Island)

South Carolina 
Yeshiva Lubavitch of Myrtle Beach

South Dakota

Tennessee 
Margolin Hebrew Academy, Memphis
Feinstone Yeshiva of the South, Memphis

Texas 
Texas Torah Institute, Dallas

Utah

Vermont

Virginia 
Yeshiva of Virginia, Richmond

Washington
Northwest Yeshiva High School, Mercer Island

West Virginia

Wisconsin
Mesivta Yeshiva Gedolah of Milwaukee
Wisconsin Institute for Torah Study, Milwaukee

Wyoming

See also 
List of Jewish communities in North America
List of synagogues in Canada
List of synagogues in the United States

References 

 
 
Mesivtas
Mesivtas
Mesivtas